Eucalyptus fracta is a species of tree or mallee that is endemic to a small area of New South Wales. It has hard, grey to black "ironbark" on the trunk and larger branches, smooth whitish bark above, lance-shaped adult leaves, flower buds in groups of seven, and cup-shaped fruit.

Description

Taxonomy and naming
Eucalyptus fracta was first described in 1997 by Ken Hill from a specimen he collected in Charmhaven with Leonie Stanberg in 1995. The description was published in the journal Telopea. The specific epithet (fracta) is a Latin word meaning "broken", a reference to the species' distribution.

Distribution and habitat
This eucalypt is only known from parts of the Broken Back Range near Cessnock where it grows in shallow soils on a sandstone escarpment.

References

fracta
Myrtales of Australia
Flora of New South Wales
Trees of Australia
Plants described in 1997